The 2004 French Open was the 108th edition of the tournament.

On the men's side, Gastón Gaudio became the first men's major champion in the Open Era to save two championship points in the final. Gaudio also became the first Argentine man since Guillermo Vilas in 1979 to win a major. Fellow Argentine Guillermo Coria, widely regarded as the favourite and the world's best clay court player coming into the tournament, was seeded 3rd for the event, whereas Gaudio was unseeded (ranked 44th). After winning the first two sets convincingly, Coria began suffering from leg cramps. Gaudio won the next two sets; however, Coria came back and was up two breaks of serve in the final set. Coria had two match points at 6–5 before Gaudio prevailed 0–6, 3–6, 6–4, 6–1, 8–6. Gaudio also became the first man to win a Grand Slam tournament final after being bagelled, which occurred in the first set. The overall tournament was noted for the performance of Argentine players – in addition to the two finalists, there were a semifinalist (David Nalbandian) and a quarterfinalist (Juan Ignacio Chela). It was also highlighted by a first round match between Fabrice Santoro and Arnaud Clément, lasting 6 hours and 33 minutes and ending in Clement's defeat 6–4, 6–3, 6–7, 3–6, 16–14, setting a new record for the longest singles match in the Open Era, which would stand until Wimbledon 2010. It was also the last major to feature neither Roger Federer nor Rafael Nadal in the semifinals until the 2012 US Open.

In the women's draw, Anastasia Myskina became first Russian woman to win a major title. The next two majors were also won by Russian women (Maria Sharapova at Wimbledon and Svetlana Kuznetsova at the US Open). She also became the first French Open women's champion after saving a match point en route to the title (against Svetlana Kuznetsova in the fourth round).

In the mixed doubles, French players Tatiana Golovin and Richard Gasquet (aged 16 and 17 respectively) won the tournament after entering as wildcards. France also saw success in the boys' singles, where Gaël Monfils won.

Juan Carlos Ferrero and Justine Henin-Hardenne were both unsuccessful in defending their 2003 titles; both being eliminated in the second round. In Henin's case, her early exit would be the last time a top seed lost within the first two rounds of any major until Ana Ivanovic lost in the second round of the 2008 US Open. Henin's loss to Tathiana Garbin in the second round was her only defeat at the tournament between 2003 and 2009 (not playing in 2008 and 2009).

This was the last major where both the men's and women's singles champions won their first major titles.

Point distribution
Below are the tables with the point distribution for each discipline of the tournament.

Champions

Seniors

Men's singles

 Gastón Gaudio defeated  Guillermo Coria, 0–6, 3–6, 6–4, 6–1, 8–6
It was Gaudio's 1st title of the year, and his 3rd overall. It was his 1st and only singles Grand Slam title.

Women's singles

 Anastasia Myskina defeated  Elena Dementieva, 6–1, 6–2 
It was Myskina's 2nd title of the year, and her 8th overall. It was her 1st and only singles Grand Slam title.

Men's doubles

 Xavier Malisse /  Olivier Rochus defeated  Michaël Llodra /  Fabrice Santoro, 7–5, 7–5
It was Malisse and Rochus' 1st career Grand Slam title.

Women's doubles

 Virginia Ruano Pascual /  Paola Suárez defeated  Svetlana Kuznetsova /  Elena Likhovtseva, 6–0, 6–3

Mixed doubles

 Tatiana Golovin /  Richard Gasquet defeated  Cara Black /  Wayne Black, 6–3, 6–4

Juniors

Boys' singles

 Gaël Monfils defeated  Alex Kuznetsov, 6–2, 6–2

Girls' singles

 Sesil Karatantcheva defeated  Mădălina Gojnea, 6–4, 6–0

Boys' doubles

 Pablo Andújar /  Marcel Granollers defeated  Alex Kuznetsov /  Mischa Zverev, 6–3, 6–2

Girls' doubles

 Kateřina Böhmová /  Michaëlla Krajicek defeated  Irina Kotkina /  Yaroslava Shvedova, 6–3, 6–2

Singles seeds

Men's singles
  Roger Federer (third round, lost to Gustavo Kuerten)
  Andy Roddick (second round, lost to Olivier Mutis)
  Guillermo Coria (final, lost to Gastón Gaudio)
  Juan Carlos Ferrero (second round, lost to Igor Andreev)
  Carlos Moyá (quarterfinals, lost to Guillermo Coria)
  Andre Agassi (first round, lost to Jérôme Haehnel)
  Rainer Schüttler (first round, lost to Xavier Malisse)
  David Nalbandian (semifinals, lost to Gastón Gaudio)
  Tim Henman (semifinals, lost to Guillermo Coria)
  Sébastien Grosjean (second round, lost to Potito Starace)
  Nicolás Massú (third round, lost to Tommy Robredo)
  Lleyton Hewitt (quarterfinals, lost to Gastón Gaudio)
  Paradorn Srichaphan (second round, lost to Àlex Corretja)
  Jiří Novák (second round, lost to Gastón Gaudio)
  Sjeng Schalken (withdrew due to viral infection)
  Fernando González (first round, lost to Florian Mayer)
  Tommy Robredo (fourth round, lost to Carlos Moyá)
  Mark Philippoussis (first round, lost to Luis Horna)
  Martin Verkerk (third round, lost to Lleyton Hewitt)
  Marat Safin (fourth round, lost to David Nalbandian)
  Andrei Pavel (second round, lost to Mikhail Youzhny)
  Juan Ignacio Chela (quarterfinals, lost to Tim Henman)
  Feliciano López (fourth round, lost to Gustavo Kuerten)
  Jonas Björkman (second round, lost to Thomas Enqvist)
  Ivan Ljubičić (second round, lost to Stefan Koubek)
  Albert Costa (third round, lost to Xavier Malisse)
  Vince Spadea (second round, lost to Julien Jeanpierre)
  Gustavo Kuerten (quarterfinals, lost to David Nalbandian)
  Max Mirnyi (first round, lost to Julien Benneteau)
  Mariano Zabaleta (second round, lost to Mario Ančić)
  Dominik Hrbatý (second round, lost to Raemon Sluiter)
  Arnaud Clément (first round, lost to Fabrice Santoro)

Women's singles
  Justine Henin-Hardenne (second round, lost to Tathiana Garbin)
  Serena Williams (quarterfinals, lost to Jennifer Capriati)
  Amélie Mauresmo (quarterfinals, lost to Elena Dementieva)
  Venus Williams (quarterfinals, lost to Anastasia Myskina)
  Lindsay Davenport (fourth round, lost to Elena Dementieva)
  Anastasia Myskina (champion)
  Jennifer Capriati (semifinals, lost to Anastasia Myskina)
  Nadia Petrova (third round, lost to Marlene Weingärtner)
  Elena Dementieva (final, lost to Anastasia Myskina)
  Vera Zvonareva (third round, lost to Maria Sharapova)
  Svetlana Kuznetsova (fourth round, lost to Anastasia Myskina)
  Ai Sugiyama (second round, lost to Virginia Ruano Pascual)
  Chanda Rubin (withdrew due to knee injury)
  Paola Suárez (semifinals, lost to Elena Dementieva)
  Silvia Farina Elia (second round, lost to Meghann Shaughnessy)
  Patty Schnyder (second round, lost to Shinobu Asagoe)
  Francesca Schiavone (fourth round, lost to Jennifer Capriati)
  Maria Sharapova (quarterfinals, lost to Paola Suárez)
  Anna Smashnova-Pistolesi (third round, lost to Elena Dementieva)
  Conchita Martínez (second round, lost to Gisela Dulko)
  Magdalena Maleeva (fourth round, lost to Amélie Mauresmo)
  Karolina Šprem (first round, lost to Myriam Casanova)
  Fabiola Zuluaga (fourth round, lost to Venus Williams)
  Jelena Dokic (first round, lost to Tatiana Perebiynis)
  Elena Bovina (third round, lost to Jennifer Capriati)
  Nathalie Dechy (first round, lost to Stéphanie Foretz)
  Eleni Daniilidou (first round, lost to Marlene Weingärtner)
  Lisa Raymond (second round, lost to Arantxa Parra Santonja)
  Petra Mandula (second round, lost to Denisa Chládková)
  Mary Pierce (third round, lost to Venus Williams)
  Émilie Loit (first round, lost to Zheng Jie)
  Dinara Safina (second round, lost to Marissa Irvin)

Wildcard entries
Below are the lists of the wildcard awardees entering in the main draws.

Men's singles wildcard entries
  Julien Boutter
  Arnaud Di Pasquale
  Jean-René Lisnard
  Michaël Llodra
  Nicolas Mahut
  Olivier Patience
  Todd Reid
  Stéphane Robert

Women's singles wildcard entries
  Séverine Beltrame
  Stéphanie Foretz
  Martina Navratilova
  Virginie Pichet
  Camille Pin
  Virginie Razzano
  Sandrine Testud
  Christina Wheeler

Men's doubles wildcard entries
  Igor Andreev /  Nikolay Davydenko
  Thierry Ascione /  Jean-François Bachelot
  Julien Boutter /  Antony Dupuis
  Sébastien de Chaunac /  Stéphane Robert
  Jérôme Haehnel /  Florent Serra
  Julien Jeanpierre /  Édouard Roger-Vasselin
  Olivier Mutis /  Olivier Patience

Women's doubles wildcard entries
  Séverine Beltrame /  Camille Pin
  Kildine Chevalier /  Sophie Lefèvre
  Stéphanie Cohen-Aloro /  Claudine Schaul
  Stéphanie Foretz /  Virginie Razzano
  Anabel Medina Garrigues /  Arantxa Sánchez Vicario
  Pauline Parmentier /  Aurélie Védy
  Virginie Pichet /  Capucine Rousseau

Mixed doubles wildcard entries
  Séverine Beltrame /  Michaël Llodra
  Stéphanie Cohen-Aloro /  Jean-François Bachelot
  Tatiana Golovin /  Richard Gasquet (champions)
  Camille Pin /  Arnaud Clément
  Virginie Razzano /  Julien Boutter (withdrew)
  Arantxa Sánchez Vicario /  Daniel Nestor

Qualifier entries

Men's qualifiers entries

  Marc Gicquel
  Florian Mayer
  Jérôme Haehnel
  Guillermo García López
  Juan Mónaco
  Kevin Kim
  Potito Starace
  Janko Tipsarević
  Julien Jeanpierre
  Ricardo Mello
  Daniel Elsner
  Alejandro Falla
  Florent Serra
  Alexander Peya
  Nicolás Almagro
  Vladimir Voltchkov

Lucky losers
  Jeff Salzenstein
  Kristof Vliegen
  Marc López
  Lee Hyung-taik

Women's qualifiers entries

  Marissa Irvin
  Shenay Perry
  Teryn Ashley
  Roberta Vinci
  Lubomira Bacheva
  Zuzana Kucová
  Julia Schruff
  Sanda Mamić
  Květa Peschke
  Yuliana Fedak
  Barbara Rittner
  Kelly McCain

Lucky losers
  Eva Birnerová
  Tzipora Obziler

Protected ranking

Men's singles
 Tommy Haas
 Kristian Pless
 Bohdan Ulihrach

Women's singles
 Mariana Díaz Oliva
 Barbara Schwartz

Withdrawals

Men's Singles
  José Acasuso → replaced by  Kristof Vliegen
  James Blake → replaced by  Christophe Rochus
  Grégory Carraz → replaced by  Marc López
  Younes El Aynaoui → replaced by  Harel Levy
  Mardy Fish → replaced by  Greg Rusedski
  Goran Ivanišević → replaced by  Jeff Salzenstein
  Yevgeny Kafelnikov → replaced by  Àlex Corretja
  Paul-Henri Mathieu → replaced by  Kristian Pless
  Rafael Nadal → replaced by  Alex Bogomolov Jr.
  Jarkko Nieminen → replaced by  Wayne Arthurs
  Sjeng Schalken → replaced by  Lee Hyung-taik

Women's Singles
  Kim Clijsters → replaced by  Catalina Castaño
  Amanda Coetzer → replaced by  Alina Jidkova
  Anne Kremer → replaced by  Eva Birnerová
  Lina Krasnoroutskaya → replaced by  Maria Kirilenko
  Chanda Rubin → replaced by  Tzipora Obziler
  Iroda Tulyaganova → replaced by  Dally Randriantefy

References

External links
 French Open official website

 
2004 in French tennis
2004 in Paris
May 2004 sports events in France
June 2004 sports events in France